Sun Devil Soccer Stadium is a soccer-specific stadium on the campus of Arizona State University in Tempe, Arizona. It is home to the Arizona State Sun Devils Women's Soccer team.  The stadium opened in 2000 and features chair-back bleachers and individual seats with a capacity for 1,051 fans.

On December 11, 2012, Phoenix FC and Arizona State Sun Devils announced a stadium agreement for the 2013 season. As part of the deal, the seating capacity was expanded by more than 2,500 additional seats, taking the total capacity to 3,400 seats.

The temporary stands, rented from the Phoenix Open Golf Tournament, were returned on July 2. The Stadium went back to its original capacity of 1,051 seats. The agreement was not renewed after the season ended.

References

External links
 Sun Devil Soccer Stadium at ASU

Arizona State Sun Devils soccer
Soccer venues in Arizona
Sports venues in Tempe, Arizona
2000 establishments in Arizona
Sports venues completed in 2000
USL Championship stadiums